L'esorciccio  (internationally released as The Exorcist: Italian Style and The Exorciccio literally "The Exor-Chuck, as 'Ciccio' is the Italian diminutive for 'Francesco' (Frankie), as Chuck/Chuckie in English) is a 1975 Italian horror-comedy film written, directed, produced and starring Ciccio Ingrassia.

A parody of William Friedkin's The Exorcist (1973), it is the second and last film directed by Ingrassia after Paolo il freddo (a parody of Paolo il caldo).

Plot
In Iran at an archaeological site, a small head of Beelzebub is recovered.

The trinket is then lost and unearthed, in a small rural town near Rome, by a kid during a football match. The kid immediately manifests signs of possession, felling a tree with the football and then forcing himself on a peasant girl in a nearby field. 
The following day the girl's parents ask for a reparation marriage but the kid's father (the town's mayor seeking re-election) dismisses their claims as a set-up to damage his reputation.

However, later, he is shocked to find evidence of the uncontrollable urges of the possessed boy; after having called the doctor (to no avail) he is forced to ask for the assistance of the notorious "Exorciccio", a lay demon-hunter.

The Exorciccio, aided by his bumbling assistant 'Satanetto' (lil'Satan) manages to exorcise the boy, his sister and finally the Mayor's wife, who all in sequence come into contact with the diabolical amulet. 
In the end it is the Mayor himself who ends up under its thrall during the celebrations for his re-election. 
The man, now possessed, shocks the crowd by urinating on the bystanders and performing a 'satanic' rock song, causing a furore during which the amulet is yet again lost and found, first by Dr. Schnautzer (the Mayor's physician) who briefly turns into a Hitler-esque figure. Finally, the accursed amulet is swallowed by the Exorciccio himself.

In the final scene the Mayor complains that the supernatural events so far occurred must have a diabolical origin; the Exorciccio (now possessed) rebukes putting in doubt the existence of the Devil, before vanishing in a plume of smoke.

Cast
 Ciccio Ingrassia as the Exorciccio
 Lino Banfi as Pasqualino Abate
 Mimmo Baldi as Satanetto
 Didi Perego as  Annunziata, Pasqualino's wife
 Barbara Nascimbene as Barbara Abate
 Gigi Bonos as Dr. Schnautzer
 Tano Cimarosa as Turi Randazzo
 Ubaldo Lay as Lt. Sheridan
 Salvatore Baccaro as Satanetto's mother
 Dante Cleri as Antonio Sgrò
 Renato Malavasi as Monsignor Evaristo
 Franca Haas as Margherita
 Ada Pometti as Domestica
 Lorenzo Piani as Armando

Production 
Due to Italian cultural sensibilities of the time, there are no mentions of organized religion and/or the Catholic Church in the film, although the Exorciccio wears clothes vaguely resembling priestly ones.

References

External links

1975 films
Italian comedy horror films
1970s comedy horror films
1970s parody films
Demons in film
Films about exorcism
Parodies of horror
1970s supernatural films
1975 comedy films
1970s Italian films